Armillaria camerunensis is a species of agaric fungus in the family Physalacriaceae. This species is found in Africa.

See also 
 List of Armillaria species

References 

camerunensis
Fungi described in 1895
Fungi of Africa
Fungal tree pathogens and diseases